New Beginnings is an album by American jazz pianist Don Pullen recorded in 1988 for the Blue Note label.

Reception
The Allmusic review by Scott Yanow awarded the album 2½ stars, stating that "Pullen sets up fairly simple structures (some of which could be grooves for Ramsey Lewis) and then, after stating the theme, tosses in playful runs that are often quite outside, essentially putting his original style from the 1960s in a slightly commercial 1980s setting." The review says he "plays quite rhythmically during his more intense phrases and displays a sly sense of humor".

Track listing
All compositions by Don Pullen
 "Jana's Delight" - 5:58
 "Once Upon a Time" - 5:51
 "Warriors" - 6:49
 "New Beginnings" - 6:22
 "At the Cafe Centrale" - 6:55
 "Reap the Whirlwind" - 7:04
 "Silence = Death" - 10:20 Bonus track on CD
Recorded in New York City on December 16, 1988

Personnel
Don Pullen - piano
Gary Peacock - bass
Tony Williams - drums

References

Blue Note Records albums
Don Pullen albums
1989 albums